Al-Jumhuriya (Arabic: الجمهورية The Republic) is a leading newspaper in the Republic of Yemen based in Taiz. The newspaper was founded in 1962, and has a pro-government stance.

The paper was founded by the Yemen Arab Republic government entity the Saba General Organization for Press alongside Al-Thawra newspaper.

The newspaper was closed for four years due to the onset of the 2015 Yemen Civil War which led to a partial destruction of its headquarters and the looting of its equipment. The newspaper reopened in October 2018 and has a pro-Hadi government stance.

See also
Al-Thawra (Yemen)

References

1962 establishments in North Yemen
Newspapers published in Yemen
Arabic-language newspapers
Publications established in 1962